The Newport News Department of Parks, Recreation and Tourism (also known as Newport News Parks) is the government agency responsible for maintaining city parks and other sites of interest to tourists and the general population within the city of Newport News, Virginia. It is under the authority of Assistant City Manager Alan Archer. The Director of Newport News Parks is Michael Poplawski.

Parks 

Newport News Parks is responsible for the maintenance of thirty-two city parks. The smallest is less than half an acre (2,000 m²). The parks are scattered throughout the city, from Endview Plantation in the northern end of the city to King-Lincoln Park in the southern end near the Monitor-Merrimac Memorial Bridge-Tunnel. The parks offer a variety of services to visitors, ranging from traditional park services like camping and fishing to activities like archery and disc golf.

See List of parks in Newport News, Virginia

Historic sites 

Newport News Parks maintains eight historic sites within the city. Four of these are located within parks.

 Battle of Dam #1, located in Newport News Park
 Battle of Lee's Mill, located in Lee's Mill Park
 Congress and Cumberland Overlook, located in Christopher Newport Park
 Monitor-Merrimac Overlook, located in Anderson Park
 Skiffe's Creek Redoubt
 Warwick Court House
 Newport News Victory Arch
 Young's Mill

All of these historic sites (with the exception of the Victory Arch) were significant during the Peninsula Campaign of the American Civil War in 1862.

Museums 

Five museums are run by the department:

 Endview Plantation, located in Newport News Park
 Lee Hall Mansion
 Lee Hall Train Depot
 Newsome House Museum & Cultural Center
 Virginia War Museum
 Mariners' Museum

Sports programs and community centers 

Newport News Parks runs eight sports facilities and community centers in the city for use by city residents.

 Achievable Dream Tennis Center 
 Brittingham-Midtown Community Center  
 Deer Run Golf Course 
 Doris Miller Recreation Center 
 Huntington Park Tennis Center
 Riverview Gymnastics Center 
 Stoney Run Athletics Center 
 Warwick Recreation Center

The department runs youth leagues for basketball, American football, soccer, indoor field hockey, and wrestling. Leagues are also run for adults in basketball, flag football, softball, table tennis, and volleyball.

External links
Newport News Department of Parks, Recreation, and Tourism official site
City of Newport News site

Organizations based in Newport News, Virginia